The qualification for the UEFA Women's Euro 2001 was held between August 21, 1999 & November 28, 2000. The first-placed of the group stage qualified directly. The second-placed and the third-placed teams played in two playoff matches for four other berths.

CLASS A

Group 1

France qualified for the final tournament.

Sweden and Spain advanced for the playoff A.

Netherlands advanced for the playoff A-B.

Group 2

Norway qualified for the final tournament.

England and Portugal advanced for the playoff A.

Switzerland advanced for the playoff A-B.

Group 3

Germany qualified for the final tournament.

Italy and Ukraine advanced for the playoff A.

Iceland advanced for the playoff A-B.

Group 4

Russia qualified for the final tournament.

Denmark and Finland advanced for the playoff A.

Yugoslavia advanced for the playoff A-B.

CLASS B

Group 5

Belgium advanced for the playoff A-B.

Group 6

Czech Republic advanced for the playoff A-B.

Group 7

Romania advanced for the playoff A-B.

Group 8

Hungary advanced for the playoff A-B.

PLAYOFF A

First leg

Second leg

Sweden won 10–3 on aggregate.

Denmark won 10–3 on aggregate.

Italy won 3–1 on aggregate.

England won 4–1 on aggregate.

Sweden, Denmark, Italy and England qualified for the final tournament.

PLAYOFF A-B

First leg

Second leg

Iceland won 10–2 on aggregate.

Switzerland won 1–1 on away goals.

Netherlands won 5–0 on aggregate.

Czech Republic won 4–2 on aggregate.

References

External links
1999-01 UEFA Women's EURO at UEFA.com
Tables & results at RSSSF.com

Women's Championship
Qual
UEFA Women's Championship qualification
UEFA
UEFA